The 2018 Minivan Championship Football Tournament is the fourth season under its current tournament format.

Group stage

Group 1
Southern Group, played at Nilandhoo.

Group 2
Northern Group, played at Foakaidhoo.

Semi-finals

Final

References

2018 in Maldivian football